The House of Ushakov is the name of an old and influential Russian noble family, whose members occupied many important positions within the Russian Empire.

Notable people 
Dmitry Ushakov (1873–1942), Russian philologist
Fyodor Ushakov (1745–1817), Russian admiral
Georgy Ushakov (1901–1963), Soviet Arctic explorer
Konstantin Ushakov (1970– ), Russian volleyball player
Nil Ushakov, Latvian journalist and politician, Mayor of Riga
Simon Ushakov (1626–1686), Russian icon painter
Yuri Ushakov (1947– ), Russian diplomat
Zinovy Ushakov (1895-1940) soviet police officer

Other uses
 , several Russian ships named after Fyodor Fyodorovich Ushakov:
 , laid down in 1892 with service in the Russo-Japanese War
 , a Sverdlov-class cruiser, laid down in 1950 and scrapped in 1987
 , laid down in 1974 renamed Admiral Ushakov in 1992
 Ushakov Island, Arctic island named after its discoverer, Georgy Ushakov

Surnames of Russian origin